Aphelia finita is a species of moth of the family Tortricidae. It is found in South Africa.

References

Endemic moths of South Africa
Aphelia (moth)
Moths described in 1924
Moths of Africa
Taxa named by Edward Meyrick